Alexander Madlung (born 11 July 1982) is a German former professional footballer who played as a centre back.

Club career
Madlung started his career at Hertha BSC before moving to VfL Wolfsburg in 2006. On 2 January 2014, he signed a one-and-a-half-year contract with Bundesliga club Eintracht Frankfurt. In late October 2015, after being a free agent for several months, he signed a contract with 2. Bundesliga side Fortuna Düsseldorf valid until 2017. His career ended in 2017 and overall he played nearly 320 matches in the first and second division of the German league pyramid.

International career 
In 2006 and 2007 Madlung won two caps for the Germany national team.

Honours
Hertha BSC
 DFB-Ligapokal: 2002

VfL Wolfsburg
 Bundesliga: 2008–09

References

External links
 
 
 
 

1982 births
Living people
Sportspeople from Braunschweig
German footballers
Footballers from Lower Saxony
Association football central defenders
Germany international footballers
Germany B international footballers
Germany under-21 international footballers
Bundesliga players
2. Bundesliga players
Hertha BSC players
Hertha BSC II players
VfL Wolfsburg players
Eintracht Frankfurt players